Barabanovka is a rural locality (a selo) in Sandugachevsky Selsoviet, Yanaulsky District, Bashkortostan, Russia. The population was 373 as of 2010. There are five streets.

Geography 
Barabanovka is located 21 km east of Yanaul (the district's administrative centre) by road. Sandugach is the nearest rural locality.

References 

Rural localities in Yanaulsky District